Zanna Bianca e il grande Kid is a 1977 Italian adventure western film directed by Vito Bruschini and starring Tony Kendall, Lea Lander, Fabricio Mariani and Gordon Mitchell. It is based on the 1906 novel White Fang, by Jack London.

Cast

References

External links
 

1977 films
Teen adventure films
1970s children's adventure films
Italian Western (genre) films
Films based on White Fang
1977 Western (genre) films
1970s Italian films